Yau may refer to:

 Yau (surname), Hong Kong surname
 Yau language, a Finisterre language of New Guinea
 Yau language (Torricelli), a Torricelli language of Papua New Guinea
 Hodï language (ISO 639-3: yau), a language of Venezuela
 Kattiniq/Donaldson Airport, near Raglan Mines, Quebec, Canada
 Yezin Agricultural University, Myanmar

See also
Yao (disambiguation)
Yaw (disambiguation)